"Vete" is a song by Bad Bunny.

Vete or VETE may also refer to:
VÉTÉ or Vincent Timsit Workshop, building in Casablanca, Morocco

People
Albert Vete (born 1993), Tongan rugby league player
Brian Sterling-Vete or Brian Vete (born 1958), English author, entrepreneur and performer
Vete Sakaio (in office 2010-), Tuvaluan politician